Sapsan may refer to:

 Sapsan, a high-speed train in Russia.
 SAPSAN, a former airline of Kazakhstan
 Sapsan Arena, football stadium in Moscow, Russia
 Hrim-2 Ukrainian tactical ballistic missile, also known as OTRK Sapsan